Tehov is a municipality and village in Prague-East District in the Central Bohemian Region of the Czech Republic. It has about 1,100 inhabitants.

Geography
It lies in the Benešov Uplands. The Říčanský Stream springs here and flows to the west.

History
The first written mention of Tehov is from 1309. There was a castle, founded in the 12th century. In 1547, the castle was already described as abandoned. the villagers gradually dismantled it into building material for their houses. Until 1919, the municipality was named Velký Tehov.

Sights
The landmark of Tehov is the Church of Saint John the Baptist. It is a Baroque church with the core from the second half of the 14th century. The tower was added in 1779.

Gallery

References

External links

Villages in Prague-East District